La Patrulla chiflada is a 1952 Argentine adventure comedy film set in  Africa, directed by Carlos Rinaldi and featuring the Los Cinco Grandes del Buen Humor (Five Greats of Good Humor) group of comic actors. It stars Rafael Carret, Jorge Luz, Zelmar Gueñol, Guillermo Rico and Juan Carlos Cambón.

Plot
The film begins with the Five aboard a ship sailing to Africa. The group later cross the desert on camel and the jungle and stay in a palace.

Cast
  Rafael Carret
  Guillermo Rico
  Jorge Luz
  Zelmar Gueñol
  Juan Carlos Cambón
  Susana Campos
  José Comellas
  Julián Bourges
  María Esther Corán
  Irma Gabriel
  Cristina Berys
  Edith Boado
  Antonio Provitilo

Reception
Raúl Manrupe and María Alejandra Portela in their book Un diccionario de films argentinos (1930-1995)  opined that La patrulla chiflada was one of the best films of the group, "well directed and contained by Rinaldi, with good gags".

References

External links
 

1952 films
1950s Spanish-language films
Argentine black-and-white films
Films directed by Carlos Rinaldi
1950s adventure comedy films
Argentine adventure comedy films
Films set on ships
Films set in Africa
Los Cinco Grandes del Buen Humor films
1952 comedy films
1950s Argentine films